Gia (trans. Γεια; Hi) is the fifth studio album by Greek singer Despina Vandi. It was released on 19 December 2001 by Heaven Music and has sold more than 400,000 units (200,000 albums) and stands at five fold-platinum in Greece. Since release, it has been re-released several times and has become one of the best-selling albums of all time in Greece. According to the DVD "Guide of the Greek discography" which is compiled privately by Petros Dragoumanos, it is the best selling album for the last 20 years in Greece. In 2010, Alpha TV's Chart Show, which uses statistics also compiled by Mr. Dragoumanos, ranked the album as the third most successful album in terms of sales in Greece during 1985-2009 and the most successful album from 2000-2009. It also certified quadruple-platinum in Cyprus and gold status in Turkey. Additionally, the album was licensed to 35 territories.

A re-release titled Gia & Ante Gia Collector's Edition was later released on 21 March 2002 and includes two discs featuring the songs from the original album plus the songs from the EP "Ante Gia". Gia was also later released in the United States by Escondida Music in 2004 as her first international release with a slightly altered track listing. The first single "Gia" reached number one on the US Billboard Club Dance Airplay. Gia was later released in Australia by Central Station and in Romania on 1 March 2004. Following the success of the album, Vandi was awarded as Best Selling Greek Artist 2001 at the World Music Awards, held in Monaco on 6 March 2002.

Track listing

Singles and music videos
The following singles were officially released to radio stations and made into music videos. The songs "Mono Agapi Sou Zito", "Ti Kano Moni Mou", "Ah Kardoula Mou", "Ola Odigoun Se Sena" and "Marameno", despite not having been released as singles, managed to gain radio airplay.
 "Gia"
 "Christougenna"
 "Lathos Anthropos"
 "Anaveis Foties / Deste Mou Ta Matia"
 "Olo Leipeis" 
 "Ela"
 "Thelo Na Se Do"

Release history

Charts

Credits and Personnel

Personnel 
Dimos Beke: backing vocals (tracks: 1-1, 1-2, 1-3, 1-4, 1-6, 1-7, 1-8, 1-9, 1-11, 2-1, 2-3, 2-4, 2-9, 2-10) || second vocal (tracks: 1-3, 1-10, 2-9)

Hakan Bingolou: oud, säz (tracks: 2-3)

Giannis Bithikotsis: baglama, bouzouki, tzoura (tracks: 1-3, 1-6, 1-7, 2-2, 2-5, 2-8)

Panagiotis Charamis: bass (tracks: 2-9)

Giorgos Chatzopoulos: guitars (tracks: 1-2, 1-3, 1-6, 1-7, 1-9, 1-10, 1-11, 2-1, 2-2, 2-3, 2-4, 2-5, 2-6, 2-7, 2-8, 2-9, 2-10)

Achilleas Diamantis: guitars (tracks: 2-9)

Pavlos Diamantopoulos: bass (tracks: 1-3, 1-6, 1-7, 2-3, 2-5, 2-7, 2-8)

Akis Diximos: second vocal (tracks: 1-3, 1-7, 2-5, 2-8)

Antonis Gounaris: cümbüş (tracks: 1-5) || guitars (tracks: 1-5, 1-6)

Paola Komini: backing vocals (tracks: 1-5, 1-6, 2-7)

Fedon Lionoudakis: accordion (tracks: 1-3, 1-6, 1-7, 2-5, 2-7, 2-8)

Andreas Mouzakis: drums (tracks: 1-3, 2-7, 2-9, 2-10)

Alex Panagis: backing vocals (tracks: 1-6, 2-2, 2-3, 2-7) || second vocal (tracks: 1-5, 1-6, 2-5, 2-7)

Elena Patroklou (tracks: 1.1, 1.2, 1.8, 1.9, 2.1, 2.4, 2.10)

Phoebus: backing vocals (tracks: 1-1) || keyboards, programming (tracks: 1-1, 1-2, 1-4, 1-8, 1-9, 2-1, 2-4, 2-7, 2-9, 2-10) || orchestration (all tracks)

Sandy Politi: backing vocals (tracks: 1-2, 1-3, 1-4, 1-5, 1-9, 1-11, 2-1, 2-2, 2-4, 2-7, 2-9, 2-10)

Giorgos Roilos: harmonica (tracks: 2-2) || percussion (tracks: 1-3, 1-6, 1-7, 1-11, 2-2, 2-3, 2-5, 2-7, 2-8)

Thanasis Vasilopoulos: clarinet (tracks: 1-5, 2-3, 2-7) || mizmar (tracks: 2-3) || ney (tracks: 2-7)

Alexandros Vourazelis: keyboards, programming (tracks: 1-3, 1-5, 1-6, 1-7, 1-10, 1-11, 2-2, 2-3, 2-5, 2-6, 2-8) || orchestration (tracks: 1-3, 1-6, 1-7, 1-10, 2-2, 2-5, 2-8)

Nikos Zervas: keyboards (tracks: 2-7)

Martha Zioga: backing vocals (tracks: 1-3, 1-4, 1-5, 1-6, 1-11, 2-2, 2-7)

Production 
Tasos Chamosfakidis: sound engineer

Thodoris Chrisanthopoulos (Fabelsound): mastering

Phoebus: executive producer

Vaggelis Siapatis: editing, sound engineer

Manolis Vlachos: mix engineer, sound engineer

Alexandros Vourazelis: sound engineer

Cover 
Costas Coutayar: photographer

Panos Kallitsis: hair styling, make up

Credits adapted from the album's liner notes.

References

2001 albums
Despina Vandi albums
Albums produced by Phoebus (songwriter)
Heaven Music albums
Ultra Records albums
Greek-language albums